The 2008 Polish Pairs Speedway Championship is the 2009 version of Polish Pairs Speedway Championship organized by the Polish Motor Union (PZM). The Final took place on 10 September 2009 in Leszno, because Unia Leszno was second in 2008 Team Speedway Polish Championship. The championships was won by Falubaz Zielona Góra; former Grand Prix riders Rafał Dobrucki, Grzegorz Walasek and junior Grzegorz Zengota.

Results

The Final 

 14 August 2009
 Leszno, Alfred Smoczyk Stadium
 Referee: Ryszard Bryła
 Best time: 60.31 secs - Jarosław Hampel in Heat 4
Change:
 (2) injury Przemysław Pawlicki → Sławomir Musielak

See also 
 2009 Team Speedway Polish Championship
 2009 Individual Speedway Polish Championship
 2009 Polish Pairs Speedway Junior Championship

References 

2009
Pairs